Telugu is a Dravidian language native to the Indian states of Andhra Pradesh and Telangana, where it is also the official language. Spoken by about 96 million people (2022), Telugu is the most widely spoken member of the Dravidian language family and one of the twenty-two scheduled languages of the Republic of India. It is one of the few languages that has primary official status in more than one Indian state, alongside Hindi and Bengali. Telugu is one of six languages designated as a classical language by the Government of India. It is the 14th most spoken native language in the world. Modern Standard Telugu is based on the dialect of Krishna-Godavari delta region in Coastal Andhra.

Telugu is also a linguistic minority in the states of Karnataka, Tamil Nadu, Maharashtra, Chhattisgarh, Orissa and the union territories of Puducherry and Andaman and Nicobar Islands. It is also spoken by members of the Telugu diaspora spread across countries like United States, Australia, Myanmar, Malaysia, Mauritius, UAE, Saudi Arabia and other countries. Telugu is the fastest-growing foreign language in the United States. It is also a protected language in South Africa and is offered as an optional third language in schools in KwaZulu-Natal province.

According to Mikhail S. Andronov, Telugu split from the Proto-Dravidian language around 1000 BCE. Earliest inscriptions with Telugu words date back to 400100 BCE in Bhattiprolu of Andhra Pradesh. Telugu words were also found in the inscriptions of Emperor Ashoka (257 BCE), Satavahanas, and Vishnukundinas. Telugu was the court language of various dynasties of Southern India namely the Kakatiyas, Vijayanagara Empire, Eastern Chalukyas, Velanati Chodas, Qutb Shahis, Madurai Nayaks, Thanjavur Nayaks. Telugu was used officially as a language of bureaucracy outside its homeland even by non-Telugu dynasties like the Thanjavur Marathas in Tamil Nadu.

Telugu has an unbroken, prolific, and diverse literary tradition of over a thousand years. Pavuluri Mallana's Sāra Sangraha Ganitamu is the oldest scientific text in any living Indian language. Avadhānaṃ, an ancient poetic art that requires immense memory power and an in-depth knowledge of literature and prosody, is specially cultivated in Telugu. Roughly 10,000 pre-colonial inscriptions exist in Telugu.

In precolonial era, Telugu became the language of high culture in South India. Vijaya Ramaswamy compared it to the overwhelming dominance of French as the cultural language of modern Europe during roughly the same era. Telugu also predominates in the evolution of Carnatic music, one of two main subgenres of Indian classical music and is widely taught in music colleges focusing on Carnatic tradition.

Etymology 

Speakers of Telugu refer to it as simply Telugu or Telugoo. Older forms of the name include Teluṅgu and Tenuṅgu. Tenugu is derived from the Proto-Dravidian word *ten ("south") to mean "the people who lived in the south/southern direction" (relative to Sanskrit and Prakrit-speaking peoples). The name Telugu, then, is a result of an "n" to "l" alternation established in Telugu.

P. Chenchiah and Bhujanga Rao note that Atharvana Acharya in the 13th century wrote a grammar of Telugu, calling it the Trilinga Śabdānusāsana (or Trilinga Grammar). Appa Kavi in the 17th century explicitly wrote that Telugu was derived from Trilinga. Scholar Charles P. Brown made a comment that it was a "strange notion" since the predecessors of Appa Kavi had no knowledge of such a derivation.

George Abraham Grierson and other linguists doubt this derivation, holding rather that Telugu was the older term and Trilinga must be the later Sanskritisation of it. If so the derivation itself must have been quite ancient because Triglyphum, Trilingum and Modogalingam are attested in ancient Greek sources, the last of which can be interpreted as a Telugu rendition of "Trilinga".

History 

According to linguist Bhadriraju Krishnamurti, Telugu, as a Dravidian language, descends from Proto-Dravidian, a proto-language. Linguistic reconstruction suggests that Proto-Dravidian was spoken around the third millennium BCE. According to the Russian linguist Mikhail S. Andronov, Telugu split from the Proto-Dravidian language around 1000 BCE.

Earliest records 
Prakrit Inscriptions with some Telugu words dating back to between 400 BCE and 100 BCE have been discovered in Bhattiprolu in the Guntur district of Andhra Pradesh. The English translation of an inscription reads, "gift of the slab by venerable Midikilayakha".

The Bhattiprolu stone Buddhist casket in proto-Telugu belongs to BCE 300, the Erragudi Asokan Rock Edict in Proto-Telugu belongs to 257 BCE, the Ghantasala Brahmin inscription and the pillar inscription of Vijaya Satakarni, Vijayapuri, and Nagarjunakonda belong to first century CE. Further, Tummalagudem inscription of Vishnukundinas belongs to 5th century CE.

One of the first words in the Telugu language, "Nagabu", was found in a Sanskrit inscription of the 1st century BCE at Amaravathi (not to be confused with the newly planned city of Amaravati). Telugu words were also found in the Dharmasila inscription of Emperor Ashoka. A number of Telugu words were found in the Sanskrit and Prakrit inscriptions of the Satavahana dynasty, Vishnukundina dynasty, and Andhra Ikshvaku. The coin legends of the Satavahanas, in all areas and all periods, used a Prakrit dialect without exception. Some reverse coin legends are in Telugu, and Tamil languages.

According to Telugu lore, its grammar has a prehistoric past. The Sage Kanva was said to be the language's first grammarian. A. Rajeswara Sarma discussed the historicity and content of Kanva's grammar. He cited twenty grammatical aphorisms ascribed to Kanva, and concluded that Kanva wrote an ancient Telugu Grammar which was lost.

Post-Ikshvaku period 

The period from 4th century CE to 1022 CE corresponds to the second phase of Telugu history, after the Andhra Ikshvaku period. This is evidenced by the first inscription that is entirely in Telugu, dated 575 CE, which was found in the Rayalaseema region and is attributed to the Renati Chodas, who broke with the prevailing custom of using Sanskrit and began writing royal proclamations in the local language. During the next fifty years, Telugu inscriptions appeared in Anantapuram and other neighbouring regions. The Madras Museum plates of Balliya-Choda dated to the mid-ninth century CE are the earliest copper plate grants in the Telugu language.

Certain exploration and excavation missions conducted by the Archaeological Department in and around the Keesaragutta temple have brought to light, a number of brick temples, cells and other structures encompassed by brick prakaram along with coins, beads, stucco figures, garbhapatra, pottery, and Brahmi label inscriptions datable to 4th and 5th centuries CE. On top of one of the rock-cut caves, an early Telugu label inscription reading as 'Thulachuvanru' can be noticed. On the basis of palaeography, the inscription is dated around the 4th to 5th centuries CE.

Telugu was more influenced by Sanskrit and Prakrit during this period, which corresponded to the advent of Telugu literature. Telugu literature was initially found in inscriptions and poetry in the courts of the rulers, and later in written works such as Nannayya's Mahabharatam (1022 CE). During the time of Nannayya, the literary language diverged from the popular language. It was also a period of phonetic changes in the spoken language.

Middle Ages 
The third phase is marked by further stylization and sophistication of the literary languages. During this period the split of the Telugu from Kannada alphabets took place. Tikkana wrote his works in this script.

Vijayanagara Empire 
The Vijayanagara Empire gained dominance from 1336 to the late 17th century, reaching its peak during the rule of Krishnadevaraya in the 16th century, when Telugu literature experienced what is considered its Golden Age.

Delhi Sultanate and Mughal influence 
A distinct dialect developed in present-day Telangana region, due to Persian/Arabic influence: the Delhi Sultanate of the Tughlaq dynasty was established earlier in the northern Deccan Plateau during the 14th century. In the latter half of the 17th century, the Mughal Empire extended further south, culminating in the establishment of the Hyderabad State by the dynasty of the Nizam of Hyderabad in 1724. This heralded an era of Persian influence on the Telugu language, especially Hyderabad State. The effect is also evident in the prose of the early 19th century, as in the kaifiyats.

In the princely Hyderabad State, the Andhra Mahasabha was started in 1921 with the main intention of promoting Telugu language, literature, its books and historical research led by Madapati Hanumantha Rao (the founder of the Andhra Mahasabha), Komarraju Venkata Lakshmana Rao (Founder of Library Movement in Hyderabad State), Suravaram Pratapareddy and others.

Colonial period 
The 15th-century Venetian explorer Niccolò de' Conti, who visited the Vijayanagara Empire, found that the words in the Telugu language end with vowels, just like those in Italian, and hence referred to it as "The Italian of the East"; a saying that has been widely repeated.

In the late 19th and the early 20th centuries, the influence of the English language was seen, and modern communication/printing press arose as an effect of British rule, especially in the areas that were part of the Madras Presidency. Literature from this time had a mix of classical and modern traditions and included works by such scholars as Gidugu Venkata Ramamoorty, Kandukuri Veeresalingam, Gurazada Apparao, Gidugu Sitapati and Panuganti Lakshminarasimha Rao.

Since the 1930s, what was considered an "elite" literary form of the Telugu language has now spread to the common people with the introduction of mass media like movies, television, radio and newspapers. This form of the language is also taught in schools and colleges as a standard.

Post-independence period 
 Telugu is one of the 22 languages with official status in India
 The Andhra Pradesh Official Language Act, 1966, declares Telugu the official language of the state that is currently divided into Andhra Pradesh and Telangana
 Telugu also has official language status in the Yanam district of the union territory of Puducherry
Telugu Language Day is celebrated every year on 29 August, the birthday of Telugu poet Gidugu Venkata Ramamurthy.
 The fourth World Telugu Conference was organised in Tirupati in the last week of December 2012. Issues related to Telugu language policy were deliberated at length.
 Telugu is the 4th most spoken Indian language in India after Hindi, Bengali and Marathi.
 Telugu is one of the six classical languages of India.
 The American Community Survey has said that data for 2016 which were released in September 2017 showed Telugu is the third most widely spoken Indian language in the US. Hindi tops the list followed by Gujarati, as of the 2010 census.

Geographic distribution 

Telugu is natively spoken in the states of Andhra Pradesh and Telangana and Yanam district of Puducherry. Telugu speakers are also found in the neighboring states of Tamil Nadu, Karnataka, Maharashtra, Odisha, Chhattisgarh, some parts of Jharkhand and the Kharagpur region of West Bengal in India. Many Telugu immigrants are also found in the states of Gujarat, Goa, Bihar, Kashmir, Uttar Pradesh, Punjab, Haryana and Rajasthan. At 7.2% of the population, Telugu is the fourth-most-spoken language in the Indian subcontinent after Hindi, Bengali and Marathi. In Karnataka, 7.0% of the population speak Telugu, and 5.6% in Tamil Nadu.

There are more than 1,000,000 Telugu Americans in the United States, with the highest concentration in Central New Jersey, also known as Little Andhra. As of 2018, Telugu is the fastest-growing language in the United States, with the number of Telugu speakers in the United States increasing by 86% between 2010 and 2017. Minority Telugus are also found in Australia, New Zealand, Bahrain, Canada, Fiji, Malaysia, Sri Lanka, Singapore, Mauritius, Myanmar, Europe (Italy, the United Kingdom), South Africa, Trinidad and Tobago, and the United Arab Emirates.

Legal status 
Telugu is the official language of the Indian states of Andhra Pradesh and Telangana. It is one of the 22 languages under schedule 8 of the constitution of India. It is one of the official languages of the union territories of Puducherry. Telugu is a protected language in South Africa. According to the Constitution of South Africa, the Pan South African Language Board must promote and ensure respect for Telugu along with other languages. The Government of South Africa announced that Telugu will be re-included as the official subject in the South African schools after it was removed from the curriculum in state schools.

In addition, with the creation in October 2004 of a legal status for classical languages by the Government of India and following a political campaign supported by several Tamil associations, on 8 August 2008, Telugu was also given the classical language status due to several campaigns.

Epigraphical records 
According to the famous Japanese historian Noboru Karashima who served as the president of the Epigraphical Society of India in 1985, there are approximately 10,000 inscriptions which exist in the Telugu language as of the year 1996 making it one of the most densely inscribed languages. Telugu inscriptions are found in all the districts of Andhra Pradesh and Telangana. They are also found in Karnataka, Tamil Nadu, Orissa, and Chhattisgarh. According to recent estimates by ASI (Archaeological Survey of India) the number of inscriptions in the Telugu language goes up to 14,000. Adilabad, Nizamabad, Hyderabad, Anantapur, and Chittoor produced no more than a handful of Telugu inscriptions in the Kakatiya era between 1175 CE and 1324 CE.

Geographical influence

Telugu region boundaries 
Andhra is characterised as having its own mother tongue, and its territory has been equated with the extent of the Telugu language. The equivalence between the Telugu linguistic sphere and the geographical boundaries of Andhra is also brought out in an eleventh-century description of Andhra boundaries. Andhra, according to this text, was bounded in north by Mahendra mountain in the modern Ganjam district in Odisha and to the south by Srikalahasteeswara temple in Chittoor district. However, Andhra extended westwards as far as Srisailam in Kurnool district, about halfway across the modern state. According to other sources in the early sixteenth century, the northern boundary is Simhachalam and the southern limit is Tirumala of the Telugu Nation.

Telugu place names 

Telugu place names are present all around Andhra Pradesh and Telangana. Common suffixes are -ooru, -pudi, -pedu, -peta, -patnam, -wada, -gallu, -cherla, -seema, -gudem, -palle, -palem and -palli. Examples that use this nomenclature are Nellore, Tadepalligudem, Guntur, Chintalapudi, Yerpedu, Narasaraopeta, Sattenapalle, Visakapatnam, Vizianagaram, Ananthagiri, Vijayawada, Vuyyuru, Macherla, Poranki, Ramagundam, Warangal, Mancherial, Peddapalli, Siddipet, Banswada, and Miryalaguda.

Dialects 

There are six major dialects in Modern Telugu:

 Northern Telangana : The old districts of Telangana: comprising Adilabad, Nizamabad, Karimnagar and Warangal
 
 Southern Telangana : The old districts of Telangana comprising Mahabubnagar, Nalgonda, major parts of Ranga Reddy. Dialect here is a blend of Northern Telangana and Rayalaseema.

 Southern AP : The old four districts of Rayalaseema together with Nellore and Prakasam.

 South-Central AP : The old districts of AP comprising Guntur and Krishna. Parts of Khammam of Telangana.

 East-Central AP : The old Godavari districts.

 Eastern AP : The old Visakhapatnam, Vijayanagaram and Srikakulam districts.

Colloquially, Telangana, Rayalaseema and Coastal Andhra dialects are considered the three Telugu dialects and regions. 

Waddar, Chenchu, and Manna-Dora are all closely related to Telugu. Other dialects of Telugu are Berad, Dasari, Dommara, Golari, Kamathi, Komtao, Konda-Reddi, Salewari, Vadaga, Srikakula, Visakhapatnam, East Godavari, Rayalaseema, Nellore, Guntur, Vadari and Yanadi.

Phonology 
The Roman transliteration used for transcribing the Telugu script is the National Library at Kolkata romanisation.

Telugu words generally end in vowels. In Old Telugu, this was absolute; in the modern language m, n, y, w may end a word. Sanskrit loans have introduced aspirated and murmured consonants as well.

Telugu does not have contrastive stress, and speakers vary on where they perceive stress. Most place it on the penultimate or final syllable, depending on word and vowel length.

Consonants 
The table below lists the consonantal phonemes of Telugu, along with the symbols used in the transliteration of the Telugu script used here.

 The aspirated and breathy-voiced consonants occur mostly in Sanskrit and Prakrit loanwords, additionally /tʰ/ is used to substitute /θ/ in English loans, the only aspirate which occurs natively is /dʱ/ which occurs only in a few compound numbers e.g. /pɐddʱenimidi/ "18" likely a result of the proto Dravidian laryngeal */H/ there is also an unaspirated /pɐddenimidi/ version which is used more commonly. All of the fricatives except for native  also only occurs in loanwords.
 Perso-Arabic phonemes like /q, x, ɣ, z/ are substituted with /k, kʰ, ɡ, d͡ʒ/ similar to Hindi.
 /t͡s, d͡z/ occurs only in native words and doesn't have aspirated/breathy forms. Native words with /t͡ʃ, d͡ʒ/ before non front vowels became /t͡s, d͡z/, the change became phonemized after loaning words with /t͡ʃ, d͡ʒ/ from other languages. Intervocalically /d͡z/ can become [z] e.g. [rɐːzu, d͡zoːli, ɡudd͡zu].
 /ʋ/ can be rounded to a [β̞ʷ] around rounded vowels.
 The common Proto Dravidian approximant */ɻ/ merged with /ɖ/ in Telugu while it was preserved as /ɽ/ in the other Southern II branch languages.
 Many of the old /ɳ/ and /ɭ/ merged with /n/ and /l/. The Telangana dialect might completely merge /ɳ/ and /ɭ/ with /n/ and /l/.

Most consonants contrast in length in word-medial position, meaning that there are long (geminated) and short phonetic renderings of the sounds. A few examples of words that contrast by length of word-medial consonants:

 /ɡɐdi/ gadi (room) – /ɡɐdːi/ gaddi (throne)'
 /ɐʈu/ aṭu (that side) – /ɐʈːu/ aṭṭu (pancake)
 /moɡɐ/ moga (male) – /moɡːɐ/ mogga (bud) 
 /nɐmɐkɐmu/ namakamu (a vedic hymn) – /nɐmːɐkɐmu/ nammakamu (belief)
 /kɐnu/ kanu (to give birth to) – /kɐnːu/ kannu (eye)
 /kɐlɐ/ kala (dream) – /kɐlːɐ/ kalla (falsehood) 
 /mɐɾi/ mari (again) – /mɐɾːi/ marri (banyan tree)

All retroflex consonants occur in intervocalic position and when adjacent to a retroflex consonant, for instance. /ʋɐːɳiː/ vāṇī 'tippet', /kɐʈɳɐm/ kaṭṇam 'dowry', /pɐɳɖu/ paṇḍu 'fruit'; /kɐɭɐ/ kaḷa 'art', /bɐːɭʈi/ bāḷṭi 'bucket' (from Portuguese balde 'bucket'). With the exception of /ɳ/ and /ɭ/, all occur word-initial in a few words, such as /ʈɐkːu/ ṭakku 'pretence', /ʈhiːʋi/ ṭhīvi 'grandeur', /ɖipːɐ/ ḍippā 'half of a spherical object', /ɖɦoːkɐː/ ḍhōkā 'danger', and /ʂoːku/ ṣōku 'fashionable appearance'.

The approximant /j/ occurs in word-initial position only in borrowed words, such as. /jɐnɡu/ yangu, from English 'young', /jɐʃɐsːu/ yaśassu from Sanskrit yaśas /jɑʃɑs/ 'fame'.

Vowels 
Vowels in Telugu contrast in length; there are short and long versions of all vowels except for /æ/, which only occurs as long. Long vowels can occur in any position within the word, but native Telugu words do not end in a long vowel. Short vowels occur in all positions of a word, with the exception of /o/, which does not occur word-finally. The vowels of Telugu are illustrated below, along with the Telugu script and romanization.

Allophones 
In most dialects, the vowel  only occurs in loan words.

Telugu has two diphthongs:  ఐ ai and  ఔ au.

Roots alter according to whether the first vowel is tense or lax. Also, if the second vowel is open (i.e.,  or ), then the first vowel is more open and centralized (e.g.,  'goat', as opposed to  'nail'). Telugu words also have vowels in inflectional suffixes that are harmonized with the vowels of the preceding syllable.

Grammar 

The traditional study of Telugu Grammar is known as vyākaraṇam (వ్యాకరణం). The first treatise on Telugu grammar, the Āndhra Śabda Cinṭāmaṇi, was written in Sanskrit by Nannayya, considered the first Telugu poet and translator, in the 12th century CE. This grammar followed patterns described in grammatical treatises such as Aṣṭādhyāyī and Vālmīkivyākaranam, but unlike Pāṇini, Nannayya divided his work into five chapters, covering samjnā, sandhi, ajanta, halanta and kriya. Every Telugu grammatical rule is derived from Pāṇinian concepts.

In the 19th century, Chinnaya Suri wrote a condensed work on Telugu grammar called Bāla Vyākaraṇam, borrowing concepts and ideas from Nannayya's grammar.

Morphosyntax 
Relations between participants in an event are coded in Telugu words through suffixation; there are no prefixes or infixes in the language. There are six word classes in Telugu: nominals (proper nouns, pronouns), verbs (actions or events), modifiers (adjectives, quantifiers, numerals), adverbs (modify the way in which actions or events unfold), and clitics.

Telugu nouns are inflected for number (singular, plural), noun class (three classes traditionally termed masculine, feminine, and neuter) and case (nominative, accusative, genitive, dative, vocative, instrumental, and locative).

Word order 
The basic word order in Telugu is subject-object-verb (SOV).

The example above can also be interpreted as 'Ambedkar will go to school', depending on the context, but it does not affect the SOV order.

Noun classes (gender) 
As with other Dravidian languages, gender in Telugu follows a semantic system, in the sense that it is mostly the meaning of the word which defines the noun class to which it belongs. There are three noun classes: masculine (human males, he-gender), feminine (human females, she-gender), and neuter (all non-humans, it-gender). The gender of most nouns is encoded through agreement/indexation in pronominal suffixes rather than overtly on the noun. 

In terms of the verbal agreement system, genders in marking on the Telugu verb only occur in the third person.

The Telugu gender system is different from Dravidian languages like Tamil given that the Telugu feminine shares indexation morphemes with the masculine plural (-ru) and with the neuter singular (-di). What characterizes the three-gender system is then the individual behavior of the singular-plural pairs of suffixes.

Pronouns 
Telugu pronouns include personal pronouns (the persons speaking, the persons spoken to, or the persons or things spoken about); indefinite pronouns; relative pronouns (connecting parts of sentences); and reciprocal or reflexive pronouns (in which the object of a verb is acted on by the verb's subject).

Personal pronouns 

In informal Telugu, personal pronouns distinguish masculine from non-masculine.

Demonstratives 
There is a wide variety of demonstrative pronouns in Telugu, whose forms depend on both proximity to the speaker and the level of formality. The formal demonstratives may also be used as formal personal pronoun, that is, the polite forms for this woman or this man and that woman or that man can also simply mean she and he in more formal contexts.

In the singular, there are four levels of formality when speaking about males and females, although the most formal/polite form is the same for both human genders. In both singular and plural, Telugu distinguishes two levels of distance from speaker (like in English), basically this and that, and these and those.

In the plural, there are no distinctions between formality levels, but once again masculine and feminine forms are the same, while the neuter demonstratives are different.

Case system 
The nominative case (karta), the object of a verb (karma), and the verb are somewhat in a sequence in Telugu sentence construction. "Vibhakti" (case of a noun) and "pratyāyamulu" (an affix to roots and words forming derivatives and inflections) depict the ancient nature and progression of the language. The "Vibhaktis" of Telugu language " డు [ɖu], ము [mu], వు [vu], లు [lu]", etc., are different from those in Sanskrit and have been in use for a long time.

Lexicon 

The lexicon of Telugu shows a pervasive influence of Sanskrit that goes back at least 1000 years; there is also evidence suggesting an earlier influence. It's estimated that 80% of Telugu's lexicon is derived from Sanskrit. Indologist David Shulman states that "Telugu must have swallowed Sanskrit whole, as it were, even before Nannaya." He further notes that "every Sanskrit word is potentially a Telugu word" and that Telugu speech and literary texts are Sanskritized to an "enormous degree". During the period 1000–1100 CE, Nannaya's re-writing of the Mahābhārata in Telugu (మహాభారతము) established the liberal borrowing of Sanskrit words. Telugu absorbed tatsamas from Sanskrit.

The relexification of Dravidian languages by Indo-Iranian languages is not an uncommon occurrence. Likewise is the case of Brahui —a Dravidian language spoken in the Balochistan and upper Sindh regions of Pakistan— with Indo-Iranian (incl. Perso-Arabic) vocabulary accounting for 40% of its lexicon.

The vocabulary of Telugu, especially in Telangana, has a trove of Persian–Arabic borrowings, which have been modified to fit Telugu phonology. This was due to centuries of Turkic rule in these regions, such as the erstwhile kingdoms of Golkonda and Hyderabad (e.g., కబురు,  for Urdu ,  or జవాబు,  for Urdu).

Modern Telugu vocabulary can be said to constitute a diglossia because the formal, standardised version of the language is either lexically Sanskrit or heavily influenced by Sanskrit, as taught in schools, and used by the government and Hindu religious institutions. However, everyday Telugu varies in such features depending upon region.

Writing system 

The Telugu script is an abugida consisting of 60 symbols — 16 vowels, 3 vowel modifiers, and 41 consonants. Telugu has a complete set of letters that follow a system to express sounds. The script is derived from the Brahmi script like those of many other Indian languages. The Telugu script is written from left to right and consists of sequences of simple and/or complex characters. The script is syllabic in nature—the basic units of writing are syllables. Since the number of possible syllables is very large, syllables are composed of more basic units such as vowels ("acchu" or "swaram") and consonants ("hallu" or "vyanjanam"). Consonants in consonant clusters take shapes that are very different from the shapes they take elsewhere. Consonants are presumed pure consonants, that is, without any vowel sound in them. However, it is traditional to write and read consonants with an implied "a" vowel sound. When consonants combine with other vowel signs, the vowel part is indicated orthographically using signs known as vowel "mātras". The shapes of vowel "mātras" are also very different from the shapes of the corresponding vowels.

Historically, a sentence used to end with either a single bar। ("pūrna virāmam") or a double bar॥ ("dīrgha virāmam"); in handwriting, Telugu words were not separated by spaces. However, in modern times, English punctuation (commas, semicolon, etc.) has virtually replaced the old method of punctuation.

Telugu has full-zero ("anusvāra" or "sunna" ) ( ం ), half-zero ("arthanusvāra" or "candrabindu" or "ara-sunna" ) (ఁ) and visarga ( ః ) to convey various shades of nasal sounds. [la] and [La], [ra] and [Ra] are differentiated.

Telugu has ĉ [t͡s] and ĵ [d͡z], which are not represented in Sanskrit.

Telugu Guṇintālu (తెలుగు గుణింతాలు) 
These are some examples of combining a consonant with different vowels.
క కా కి కీ కు కూ కృ కౄ కె కే కై కొ కో కౌ క్ కం కః
ఖ ఖా ఖి ఖీ ఖు ఖూ ఖృ ఖౄ ఖె ఖే ఖై ఖొ ఖో ఖౌ ఖ్ ఖం ఖః

Number system 
Telugu has ten digits employed with the Hindu–Arabic numeral system. However, in modern usage, the Arabic numerals have replaced them.

Telugu is assigned Unicode codepoints: 0C00-0C7F (3072–3199).

Literature

The Pre-Nannayya Period (before 1020 CE)

In the earliest period Telugu literature existed in the form of inscriptions, precisely from 575 CE onward.

The Jain Literature Phase (850–1000 CE)

Prabandha Ratnavali (1918) & Pre-Nannayya Chandassu (Raja Raja Narendra Pattabhisekha Sanchika) by Veturi Prabhakara Sastry talk about the existence of Jain Telugu literature during 850-1000 CE. A verse from Telugu Jinendra Puranam by Adikavi Pampa, a couple of verses from Telugu Adi Puranam by Sarvadeva and Kavijanasrayam by Malliya Rechana were all authored by Jain poet's and are the examples for Jain contribution to Telugu Literature.

Historically, Vemulawada was a Jain knowledge hub and played a significant role in patronizing Jain literature and poets. Excavations in the 1980s around Vemulawada revealed and affirmed the existence of Telugu Jain literature.

Malliya Rechana is considered to be the first Telugu Author. P.V. Parabrahma Sastry, Nidadavolu Venkata Rao, P.V.P Sastry also pointed out that many Jain works could have been destroyed. Historical rivalry among Hinduism, Jainism and Buddhism is well known.

The Age of the Puranas (1020–1400 CE)

This is the period of Kavi Trayam or Trinity of Poets. Nannayya, Tikkana and Yerrapragada (or Errana) are known as the Kavi Trayam.

Nannaya Bhattarakudu or Adi Kavi (1022–1063 CE)

Nannaya Bhattarakudu's (Telugu: నన్నయ భట్టారకుడు) Andhra Mahabharatam, who lived around the 11th century, is commonly referred to as the first Telugu literary composition (aadi kaavyam). Although there is evidence of Telugu literature before Nannaya, he is given the epithet Aadi Kavi ("the first poet"). Nannaya Bhattu acknowledged the help extended to him by his friend Narayana Bhattu in his composition in fields like making choices of grammatical forms, metres, form of the book, etc. and compares it to that extended to Arjuna by God Sri Krishna in the Bharata war. Scholar and poet K. Ayyappa Paniker states that both Nannaya Bhattu and Narayana Bhattu were Kannada origin scholars. Nannaya was the first to establish a formal grammar of written Telugu. This grammar followed the patterns which existed in grammatical treatises like Aṣṭādhyāyī and Vālmīkivyākaranam but unlike Pāṇini, Nannayya divided his work into five chapters, covering samjnā, sandhi, ajanta, halanta and kriya.[14] Nannaya completed the first two chapters and a part of the third chapter of the Mahabharata epic, which is rendered in the Champu style.

Tikkana Somayaji (1205–1288 CE): Nannaya's Andhra Mahabharatam was almost completed by Tikanna Somayaji (Telugu: తిక్కన సోమయాజి) (1205–1288) who wrote chapters 4 to 18.

Yerrapragada: (Telugu: ఎర్రాప్రగడ) who lived in the 14th century, finished the epic by completing the third chapter. He mimics Nannaya's style in the beginning, slowly changes tempo and finishes the chapter in the writing style of Tikkana. These three writers – Nannaya, Tikanna and Yerrapragada – are known as the Kavitraya ("three great poets") of Telugu. Other such translations like Marana's Markandeya Puranam, Ketana's Dasakumara Charita, Yerrapragada's Harivamsam followed. Many scientific works, like Ganitasarasangrahamu by Pavuluri Mallana and Prakirnaganitamu by Eluganti Peddana, were written in the 12th century.

Baddena Bhupala (1220–1280 CE)

Sumati Shatakam, which is a neeti ("moral"), is one of the most famous Telugu Shatakams. Shatakam is composed of more than a 100 padyalu (poems). According to many literary critics Sumati Shatakam was composed by Baddena Bhupaludu (Telugu: బద్దెన భూపాల) (CE 1220–1280). He was also known as Bhadra Bhupala. He was a Chola prince and a vassal under the Kakatiya empress Rani Rudrama Devi, and a pupil of Tikkana. If we assume that the Sumati Shatakam was indeed written by Baddena, it would rank as one of the earliest Shatakams in Telugu along with the Vrushadhipa Satakam of Palkuriki Somanatha and the Sarveswara Satakam of Yathavakkula Annamayya. The Sumatee Shatakam is also one of the earliest Telugu works to be translated into a European language, as C. P. Brown rendered it in English in the 1840s.

Palkuriki Somanatha: Important among his Telugu language writings are the Basava Purana, Panditaradhya charitra, Malamadevipuranamu and Somanatha Stava–in dwipada metre ("couplets"); Anubhavasara, Chennamallu Sisamalu, Vrishadhipa Shataka and Cheturvedasara–in verses; Basavodharana in verses and ragale metre (rhymed couplets in blank verse); and the Basavaragada.

Gona Budda Reddy: His Ranganatha Ramayanam was a pioneering work in the Telugu language on the theme of the Ramayana epic. Most scholars believe he wrote it between 1300 and 1310 A.D., possibly with help from his family. The work has become part of cultural life in Andhra Pradesh and is used in puppet shows.

In the Telugu literature Tikkana was given agraasana (top position) by many famous critics.

Paravastu Chinnayya Soori (1807–1861) is a well-known Telugu writer who dedicated his entire life to the progress and promotion of Telugu language and literature. Sri Chinnayasoori wrote the Bala Vyakaranam in a new style after doing extensive research on Telugu grammar. Other well-known writings by Chinnayasoori are Neethichandrika, Sootandhra Vyaakaranamu, Andhra Dhatumoola, and Neeti Sangrahamu.

Kandukuri Veeresalingam (1848–1919) is generally considered the father of modern Telugu literature. His novel Rajasekhara Charitamu was inspired by the Vicar of Wakefield. His work marked the beginning of a dynamic of socially conscious Telugu literature and its transition to the modern period, which is also part of the wider literary renaissance that took place in Indian culture during this period. Other prominent literary figures from this period are Gurajada Appa Rao, Viswanatha Satyanarayana, Gurram Jashuva, Rayaprolu Subba Rao, Devulapalli Krishnasastri and Srirangam Srinivasa Rao, popularly known as Mahakavi Sri Sri. Sri Sri was instrumental in popularising free verse in spoken Telugu (vaaduka bhasha), as opposed to the pure form of written Telugu used by several poets in his time. Devulapalli Krishnasastri is often referred to as the Shelley of Telugu literature because of his pioneering works in Telugu Romantic poetry.

Viswanatha Satyanarayana won India's national literary honour, the Jnanpith Award for his magnum opus Ramayana Kalpavrukshamu. C. Narayana Reddy won the Jnanpith Award in 1988 for his poetic work, Viswambara. Ravuri Bharadhwaja won the 3rd Jnanpith Award for Telugu literature in 2013 for Paakudu Raallu, a graphic account of life behind the screen in film industry. Kanyasulkam, the first social play in Telugu by Gurajada Appa Rao, was followed by the progressive movement, the free verse movement and the Digambara style of Telugu verse. Other modern Telugu novelists include Unnava Lakshminarayana (Maalapalli), Bulusu Venkateswarulu (Bharatiya Tatva Sastram), Kodavatiganti Kutumba Rao and Buchi Babu.

Media

Telugu support on digital devices 
Telugu input, display, and support were initially provided on the Microsoft Windows platform. Subsequently, various browsers, computer applications, operating systems, and user interfaces were localized in Telugu Language for Windows and Linux platforms by vendors and free and open-source software volunteers. Telugu-capable smart phones were also introduced by vendors in 2013.

On 15 February 2018, Apple devices were experiencing crashes of apps and device shutdowns when two particular characters from the Telugu language (specifically జ్ఞా) was rendered on the display. Reports show that this has affected iOS, MacOS, tvOS and watchOS. On 20 February, Apple announced that the bug was fixed with the iOS 11.2.6 update.

See also 

 Telugu grammar
 Telugu Language Day
 Telugu people
 Telugu states
 Telugu years
 List of languages by number of native speakers in India
 List of Telugu-language television channels
 States of India by Telugu speakers
 Telugu language policy

References

Bibliography 

 Albert Henry Arden, A Progressive Grammar of the Telugu Language (1873).
 Charles Philip Brown, English–Telugu dictionary (1852; revised ed. 1903); 
 The Linguistic Legacy of Indo-Guyanese The Linguistic Legacy of Indian-Guyanese 
 Languages of Mauritius Languages of Mauritius – Mauritius Attractions 
 Charles Philip Brown, A Grammar of the Telugu Language (1857)
 P. Percival, Telugu–English dictionary: with the Telugu words printed in the Roman as well as in the Telugu Character (1862, Internet Archive edition)
 Gwynn, J. P. L. (John Peter Lucius). A Telugu–English Dictionary Delhi; New York: Oxford University Press (1991; online edition ).
 Uwe Gustafsson, An Adiwasi Oriya–Telugu–English dictionary, Central Institute of Indian Languages Dictionary Series, 6. Mysore: Central Institute of Indian Language (1989).
 
 Callā Rādhākr̥ṣṇaśarma, Landmarks in Telugu Literature: A Short Survey of Telugu Literature (1975).

External links 

 
 Telugu language at Encyclopædia Britannica 
 Hints and resources for learning Telugu
 English to Telugu online dictionary
 'Telugu to English' and 'English to Telugu' Dictionary
 Dictionary of mixed Telugu By Charles Philip Brown
 Origins of Telugu Script
 Online English – Telugu dictionary portal that includes many popular dictionaries
 English–Telugu Dictionary
 Telugu Hindu literature

 
Classical Language in India
Dravidian languages
Languages of Andhra Pradesh
Languages of Telangana
Languages of Puducherry
Languages of Tamil Nadu
Official languages of India
Languages attested from the 6th century
Agglutinative languages
Subject–object–verb languages
Vowel-harmony languages
Ancient languages
Languages of Karnataka
Languages of Malaysia
Languages of Maharashtra
Languages of Odisha
Languages of Sri Lanka
Languages of South Africa
Languages of Asia
Languages of Mauritius
Languages of West Bengal
Languages of Bahrain
Languages of Qatar
Languages of Kuwait
Languages of Kerala
Languages with own distinct writing systems
Languages officially written in Indic scripts
Sahitya Akademi recognised languages